Andrew Carl Ford (born 4 May 1954, Minehead) is an English football manager and former professional player.

Playing career
Ford played for Southend United, Swindon Town and Gillingham between 1972 and 1982. He also played for non-league Dartford.

Managerial career
Ford's first management job was at Gravesend and Northfleet (now known as Ebbsfleet United). He guided the team to the Isthmian League title in 2001-02 and several Kent Senior Cup successes, and then kept the side in the Conference Premier for several seasons before his resignation in 2005. He is the club's most successful manager.

Shortly after leaving Gravesend, Ford became assistant manager of Stevenage Borough, spending a year at the club before leaving in 2006.

In January 2008 he was appointed manager of Welling United, a position he kept until his resignation in October 2009.

A year later in October 2010 Ford took over at Isthmian League Premier Division basement side Maidstone United. However, he could not lift the Stones from the foot of the table and he resigned on 15 March 2011 with his side bottom of the league and 8 points adrift from safety.

References

External links

1954 births
Living people
People from Minehead
English footballers
Association football defenders
Gillingham F.C. players
AFC Bournemouth players
Southend United F.C. players
Swindon Town F.C. players
Dartford F.C. players
English Football League players
English football managers
Welling United F.C. managers
Maidstone United F.C. managers